Nicole Robilotto Nason (born August 12, 1970) is an American government official who served as the 26th Administrator of the Federal Highway Administration from 2019 to 2021. Nason previously served as the Assistant Secretary of State for Administration.

Career 
Nason's career in the Department of Transportation began in March 2003 when she was appointed to assistant secretary for governmental affairs, and two years later was nominated by President George W. Bush in January 2006 to be the administrator of the National Highway Traffic Safety Administration. She remained in that post until August 2008. According to former EPA staff, she impeded their efforts to regulate greenhouse gas emissions from motor vehicles by failing to coordinate with them. She also ordered NHTSA employees not to communicate with the press in divergence from previous policy. Nason was appointed a senior advisor to Secretary of State Rex Tillerson in June 2017. In December of that year, she was appointed assistant secretary of state for administration by President Trump. In January 2019, she was added to a package of 17 nominations to be voted on by the Senate in March.

On January 4, 2019, President Trump nominated her to serve as administrator of the Federal Highway Administration. On March 28, 2019, she was confirmed by the Senate by a vote of 95–1 and was sworn in May 7, 2019. She left office on January 20, 2021, when Joe Biden was sworn in as President.

References

External links

1970 births
Living people
American University alumni
Case Western Reserve University School of Law alumni
American lawyers
American women lawyers
United States Department of Transportation officials
Heads of United States federal agencies
United States Assistant Secretaries of State
Administrators of the Federal Highway Administration
Trump administration personnel
21st-century American women